Les Plaines is a provincial electoral district in Quebec. It will be first contested in the 2018 Quebec general election.

Members of the National Assembly

Election results

References

Quebec provincial electoral districts